The Paceship 20 is a Canadian sailing dinghy, that was designed by Cuthbertson & Cassian and first built in 1970.

Production
The boat was built by Paceship Yachts in Mahone Bay, Nova Scotia, Canada, but it is now out of production.

Design
The Paceship 20 is a small recreational dinghy, built predominantly of fiberglass, with wood trim. It has a fractional sloop rig, a transom-hung rudder and a folding centreboard keel. It displaces .

The boat may be fitted with a small outboard motor for docking and maneuvering.

Operational history
The boat was at one time supported by an active class club, The Paceship, but the club is currently inactive.

See also
List of sailing boat types

Similar sailboats
Buccaneer 200
Cal 20
Core Sound 20 Mark 3
Halman 20
Hunter 18.5
Hunter 19-1
Hunter 19 (Europa)
Hunter 20
Mistral T-21
Sandpiper 565
San Juan 21
Santana 20
Sirius 22
Typhoon 18

References

External links

Dinghies
1970s sailboat type designs
Sailing yachts
Sailboat type designs by C&C Design
Sailboat types built by Paceship Yachts